Jablonec nad Nisou District is a district (okres) within the Liberec Region of the Czech Republic. Its capital is the city of Jablonec nad Nisou.

List of municipalities
Albrechtice v Jizerských horách –
Bedřichov –
Dalešice –
Desná –
Držkov –
Frýdštejn –
Harrachov –
Jablonec nad Nisou –
Janov nad Nisou –
Jenišovice –
Jílové u Držkova –
Jiřetín pod Bukovou –
Josefův Důl –
Koberovy –
Kořenov –
Líšný –
Loužnice –
Lučany nad Nisou –
Malá Skála –
Maršovice –
Nová Ves nad Nisou –
Pěnčín –
Plavy –
Pulečný –
Radčice –
Rádlo –
Rychnov u Jablonce nad Nisou –
Skuhrov –
Smržovka –
Tanvald –
Velké Hamry –
Vlastiboř –
Zásada –
Železný Brod –
Zlatá Olešnice

References

 
Districts of the Czech Republic